The artery of Percheron (AOP) is a rare anatomical variation in the brain vascularization in which a single arterial trunk arises from the posterior cerebral artery (PCA) to supply both sides of the thalamus and midbrain.

Clinical significance 
The functions of the thalamus and midbrain include the regulation of consciousness, sleep and alertness. Occlusion of the artery of Percheron, for example by a clot, could result in a posterior circulation infarct impairing structures on both sides of the brain. This can produce a bizarre disturbance such as sleep from which the patient cannot be awakened.

History 
The artery of Percheron was first described in 1973 by the French medical scientist Gerard Percheron.

References 

Brain
Arteries of the head and neck
Anatomical variations